Kula (Likula) is a Bantu language of the Democratic Republic of Congo.

References

Buja-Ngombe languages
Languages of the Democratic Republic of the Congo